The Bilbao tram is a tram system in Bilbao, Basque Country, Spain. Operated by Euskotren under the brand Euskotren Tranbia (which also manages the tram system in Vitoria-Gasteiz), it comprises a single  line, inaugurated on 18 December 2002 and last extended on 25 March 2022.

The factor leading its creation was to improve Bilbao's railway network; the tram serves neighborhoods that do not have metro or Cercanías stations. Also, the line goes through important tourist and cultural spots, like the Guggenheim Museum Bilbao. It offers connections with the Bilbao metro, Euskotren Trena and Cercanías Bilbao.

History 
The EuskoTran brand (currently known as Euskotren Tranbia) was conceived in order to improve the railway services in Bilbao, and to serve neighborhoods and areas unattended by the Bilbao metro or Cercanías Bilbao. It took 15 years of studies and research to contemplate the need of a tram in the city.

The construction of the first phase of the line started in May 1999. The first six stops were opened on 18 December 2002 by Juan José Ibarretxe, lehendakari of the Basque Country at the time. Between 2003 and 2004 four new stops were opened.

In 2008 a proposal was made to expand the line with three more stops. The construction of two of the three stops (the last one being ultimately discarded) started in 2010. The two stops (called Basurto and La Casilla) were inaugurated on 25 April 2012.

On 25 March 2022, the line was extended from Atxuri to Bolueta using the former Euskotren Trena alignment between Kukullaga and Atxuri; disused since 2019 when all train services where rerouted through line 3 of the metro.

System

Station design 
The whole line has sixteen stations (as of March 2022). The tram stops have low platforms, and in some stations regular sidewalks are used instead. With the exception of Bilbao-Atxuri station, all stops and stations are un-staffed and have automated ticket machines for ticket sales. Once bought, the ticket must be validated on the validation machine located next to the ticket machine. The floor of the stations are virtually in level with the one of the trams, so this allows wheelchairs, prams, pushchairs and the elderly to board the tram easily with no steps.

Lines 

The network comprises a single line, formerly called Line A, running from Atxuri to in La Casilla. On weekdays, the first departure from Atxuri is at 5:58 and from La Casilla at 6:26. Trams run every 10 minutes during most of the day, and less frequently early in the morning and late in the night. The last departure from Atxuri is at 22:58 and from La Casilla at 23:26. Weekend service has longer headways and shorter hours of operation.

The first part of the line, from Atxuri to Pío Baroja and again from Sabino Arana to La Casilla runs on the street (albeit on a dedicated lane). From Pío Baroja to Euskalduna, the tram goes through green track.

Stop list

Network map

Future developments

Autonomía 
Euskotren projected the extension of the line from its former terminus, Ospitalea/Hospital (called Basurto at the time), to Autonomía avenue and the Errekalde district, but after the 2009 election the project was modified. Construction of two more stops started in 2010, one in Autonomía and the second one in La Casilla Square (replacing the one in Errekalde). This extension opened in 2012. There are plans to extend the line from there to Abando, thus creating a circular line with a branch.

Etxebarri 
The original terminus of the tramway line is Atxuri. This station also served as the terminus for Euskotren's commuter rail lines until 2019, when the last remaining services started running through the third metro line. This has freed the former railway line between Atxuri and Kukullaga, which will be used by the tram. The works to convert the line to tramway standard started in 2020, which will include the construction of a new stop serving La Peña and the adaptation of the existing Bolueta station. This extension won't reach Kukullaga until 2025, because a temporary depot for Line 3 is being built on the tracks around that station.

Zorrotzaurre 
With the redevelopment of Zorrotzaurre, there are plans to connect the existing line with the neighborhoods of Zorrotza and Zorrotzaurre.

References

External links 
 
 

Transport in Bilbao
Tram transport in Spain
Metre gauge railways in Spain
Euskotren
2002 establishments in the Basque Country (autonomous community)
Railway lines opened in 2002